Inna Bocoum, also known as Inna Modja (born May 19, 1984), is a Malian-French female singer and model. "Modja" means "bad, not good" in Fulfulde.

Childhood and adolescence
Born on May 19, 1984, in Bamako, Mali, in a Fula family, the sixth of seven children, Inna Bocoum owes her artist name to her mother, who gave her the nickname of Inna Modja, which means "Inna is bad" or "Inna is not good" in Fulfulde. When she was six, her parents enrolled her in a choir. At home, her father encouraged her to progress by playing her some records he liked (artists such as Ray Charles, Ella Fitzgerald, Otis Redding, Sarah Vaughan). She was also influenced by her older siblings, who transitioned into Thrash Punk, '80/'90s Rap, Heavy Metal periods, in addition to Blues, Soul and Disco. As a teenager, she still alternated between Hard Rock and love songs. She regularly visited her neighbour, Salif Keita, who invites her to be part of the Rail Band of Bamako, a group of swinging old men (Bossa Nova and Jazz), amongst whom he himself debuted.

She speaks against female genital mutilation, as she herself and her four sisters were circumsized without their parents' approval, an event she sang about in one of her songs. She since had reconstructive surgery done.
She's also outspoken against violence against women, which she portrayed in the music video of her song "La Valse de Marylore".

2009: Early career and Everyday is a New World
From these experiences, Inna Modja learned to adapt to different rhythms, like Swing or Disco. She finally settled on a Pop and Soul sounds. After appearing on a Fête de la Musique special TV show produced by France 2 singing a duet with Jason Mraz on his song "Lucky", Inna Modja opened for Sliimy on several of his shows. She released her first single, "Mister H", which is included on her first album "Everyday is a New World", itself released on October 2009. She supported it with appearances on several TV shows, including "Vivement Dimanche" and "Taratata".

2011–present: Love Revolution
She made a comeback in June 2011 with her new single "French Cancan (Monsieur Sainte Nitouche)". It quickly became one of the biggest Summer hits of 2011 in France and went No. 4 on the SNEP French Singles Chart. She followed this success with "La Fille du Lido", the second single off her second album "Love Revolution" which was released on November 7. She participated to the annual Téléthon, which benefits the French Association Against Myopathies. The music video for the third single, "I Am Smiling" (February 2012), was entirely made from videos from her fans.

She contributed a cover of "Souris Puisque C'est Grave" on Alain Chamfort's cover album Elles & Lui (2012), and lent her voice to the charity single "Je Reprends Ma Route", to benefit the association "Les Voix de l'enfant".

In 2018 she was part of the re-imagining, at Laurent Ruquier's inspiration, of Claude Bolling's Les Parisiennes.

Discography

Albums

Singles

References

External links
Official website 

1984 births
Living people
21st-century Malian women singers
French people of Malian descent
People from Bamako
21st-century French women singers
Malian emigrants to France
Activists against female genital mutilation
Violence against women in Mali